The American Journal of Managed Care is a monthly peer-reviewed medical journal published by Managed Care & Healthcare Communications.
The editors-in-chief are A. Mark Fendrick and Michael E. Chernew. In 2020 it had an impact factor of 2.229.

References

Publications established in 1995
Monthly journals
English-language journals